Sant'Antonio Abate is a Roman Catholic church facing Piazza Dante in the city center of Lugano, Switzerland, and dedicated to Anthony the Great.

Construction for the building started in 1633 and continued throughout the centuries.

The rich stucco decoration of the interior was executed in 1652 by Luca Corbellini and G. B. Bellotto, and was continued in 1683 by G. Rossi.

Italian poet Alessandro Manzoni studied there between 1796 and 1798.

Gallery

References

Lugano
Churches in Ticino
Culture in Lugano
Tourist attractions in Ticino